Rod cGMP-specific 3',5'-cyclic phosphodiesterase subunit alpha is an enzyme that in humans is encoded by the PDE6A gene.

PDE6A encodes the cyclic-GMP (cGMP) specific phosphodiesterase 6A alpha subunit, expressed in cells of the retinal rod outer segment. The phosphodiesterase 6 holoenzyme is a heterotrimer composed of an alpha, beta, and two gamma subunits. cGMP is an important regulator of rod cell membrane current, and its dynamic concentration is established by phosphodiesterase 6A cGMP hydrolysis and guanylate cyclase cGMP synthesis. Mutations in PDE6A have been identified as one cause of autosomal recessive retinitis pigmentosa.

References

Further reading

External links
  GeneReviews/NCBI/NIH/UW entry on Retinitis Pigmentosa Overview